Edward J. Powers was an American business executive who served as president and general manager of the Boston Garden.

Early life
Powers was born in Haverhill, Massachusetts. He graduated from the Bentley School of Accounting and Finance and the Northeastern University School of Business. Prior to working for the Boston Garden, Powers was a junior accountant for a Boston tool company.

Boston Garden
After spending months lobbying Boston Garden treasurer George Clare for a job, Powers was hired as an accounting clerk in January 1929. He moved up the ranks to the positions of vice president-assistant treasurer and then vice president-treasurer. As vice president, Powers was in charge of the Boston Garden when president Walter A. Brown was out of town. On September 16, 1964, Powers was chosen to succeed the late Brown as president and general manager of the Boston Garden.

Personal life and death
Powers lived in Medford, Massachusetts for many years. He and his wife had three sons. Powers was a trustee of Bentley School of Accounting and Finance and Fisher College.

Powers died on May 8, 1973. He had been hospitalized since April 23.

References

1973 deaths
American accountants
American sports executives and administrators
Bentley University alumni
Boston Garden
Northeastern University alumni
Sportspeople from Haverhill, Massachusetts
People from Medford, Massachusetts